The Australian Army Public Relations Service (AAPRS) was formed in 1994 from personnel of the Royal Australian Army Educational Corps (Public Relations), a separate corps to RAAEC. Personnel employed in the AAPRS include photographers, reporters and public relations officers.

Role 
The service provides public relations support to Australian Defence Force (ADF) operations, exercises and other activities, in Australia and overseas. It is tasked with supporting regional community relations activities through to the production of public relations product, such as video, still photography and text, in areas of operation for release in support of ADF strategic communications objectives.

Notes

References

Order of precedence

Australian Army Corps
Military units and formations established in 1994
1994 establishments in Australia
Public relations in Australia